Cian Kenny (born 2001) is an Irish hurler who plays for club side James Stephens and at inter-county level with the Kilkenny senior hurling team. He usually lines out at midfield.

Career

Kenny first played at juvenile and underage levels with the James Stephens club before progressing onto the senior team. As a schoolboy with St. Kieran's College, he won an All-Ireland Colleges Championship title in 2019. Kenny first appeared at inter-county level as a member of the Kilkenny minor hurling team that lost the 2018 All-Ireland minor final to Galway. He progressed onto the under-20 team before being drafted onto the Kilkenny senior hurling team for the 2022 National League.

Career statistics

Honours

St. Kieran's College
All-Ireland Colleges Senior Hurling Championship: 2019
Leinster Colleges Senior Hurling Championship: 2019

Kilkenny
Leinster Minor Hurling Championship: 2018

References

2001 births
Living people
James Stephens hurlers
Kilkenny inter-county hurlers